The Stand Down Order was the title of a general order issued by Field Marshall Claude Auchinleck, the Supreme Commander of the Indian and Pakistani military forces, in 1947. It directed that, in the event of a war between the newly independent dominions of India and Pakistan, all the British officers on both sides should immediately stand down. The order was never invoked. However, it was raised when the Pakistani Governor General, Mohammad Ali Jinnah, ordered Pakistani Army to march into Kashmir following the Indian air lift of troops for its defence. At Auchinleck's instance, Jinnah was forced to rescind his order. In subsequent months, the British government watered down the strength of the order, and General Douglas Gracey, the Commander-in-Chief of the Pakistani Army, defied it. Three brigades of the Pakistani Army were fighting in Kashmir in May 1948, as reported by Pakistan's foreign minister, Sir Zafrullah Khan, to the United Nations Commission for India and Pakistan.

References

Bibliography 
 
 
 
 
 
 
 

General orders
Military history of British India
Indo-Pakistani War of 1947–1948
History of the Indian Army
Kashmir conflict